Adil Belgaïd (born 15 September 1970) is a Moroccan judoka.

Achievements

External links
 

1970 births
Living people
Moroccan male judoka
Judoka at the 1996 Summer Olympics
Judoka at the 2000 Summer Olympics
Judoka at the 2004 Summer Olympics
Olympic judoka of Morocco
Mediterranean Games bronze medalists for Morocco
Mediterranean Games silver medalists for Morocco
Mediterranean Games medalists in judo
Competitors at the 1993 Mediterranean Games
Competitors at the 1997 Mediterranean Games
20th-century Moroccan people
21st-century Moroccan people
African Games medalists in judo
Competitors at the 2003 All-Africa Games
African Games gold medalists for Morocco